Mestolobes amethystias is a moth of the family Crambidae described by Edward Meyrick in 1899. It is endemic to the Hawaiian islands of Kauai and Hawaii.

External links

Crambinae
Endemic moths of Hawaii
Moths described in 1899
Taxa named by Edward Meyrick